Marin Draganja and Lovro Zovko were the defending champions but chose not to compete.

Rameez Junaid and Philipp Oswald won the title, defeating Jamie Delgado and Jordan Kerr 6–4, 6–4 in the final.

Seeds

Draw

Draw

References
Main Draw

Sibiu Open - Doubles
Sibiu Open
2013 in Romanian tennis